José Daniel Meléndez Mayorga (born 19 May 1993 in Calabozo or Zaraza, Guárico) is a Venezuelan sprinter.  He competed in the 4 × 400 m relay event at the 2012 Summer Olympics.

Personal bests
200 m: 20.94 (wind: +1.1 m/s) –  Barquisimeto, 25 August 2012
400 m: 45.82 –  Moscow, 11 August 2013

Achievements

References

External links
 

1993 births
Living people
Venezuelan male sprinters
Olympic athletes of Venezuela
Athletes (track and field) at the 2012 Summer Olympics
Athletes (track and field) at the 2015 Pan American Games
People from Guárico
World Athletics Championships athletes for Venezuela
Athletes (track and field) at the 2018 South American Games
South American Games silver medalists for Venezuela
South American Games medalists in athletics
Central American and Caribbean Games medalists in athletics
Competitors at the 2014 Central American and Caribbean Games
Central American and Caribbean Games silver medalists for Venezuela
Pan American Games competitors for Venezuela
20th-century Venezuelan people
21st-century Venezuelan people